The women's 100 metres event at the 1991 Pan American Games was held in Havana, Cuba with the final on 4 and 5 August.

Medalists

Results

Heats

Wind:Heat 1: -1.3 m/s, Heat 2: +0.8 m/s

Final
Wind: +0.4 m/s

References

Athletics at the 1991 Pan American Games
1991
Pan